Stephen Glover (1812/13– 7 December 1870), was a composer and teacher.

Stephen Glover was brother to Charles William Glover. He was born in London in 1812 or 1813, and became a popular composer of songs, ballads, and duets. The Monks of Old (1842), What are the Wild Waves Saying (1850), Excelsior, and Songs from the Holy Scriptures illustrate the range and taste of the fourteen or fifteen hundred compositions Glover presented to the public from 1847 until his death, on 7 December 1870, at the age of 57.

NOTE: A song by Stephen Glover is not shown in the listings of his compositions. On the cover of piece of sheet music published in New York, it is entitled "Gently Sighs the Breeze." At the bottom it reads: "The popular duet, written for Madlle. Jenny Lind & Madlle. Marietta Alboni." The inside of the sheet gives the title as "The Evening Breeze", with words by J. E. Carpenter.  It is likely an 1848/50 publication. The cover has a black & white litho of the two women.

References

External links
 
Sheet music for "The good bye at the Door", Augusta, GA: Blackmar & Bro, from the Confederate Imprints Sheet Music Collection
Sheet music for "Mother! Can This Glory Be?", Mobile, AL: J. H. Snow, 1862, from the Confederate Imprints Sheet Music Collection

1813 births
1870 deaths
English composers
19th-century English educators
19th-century British composers
Musicians from London
19th-century English musicians